Voldemārs Elmūts (2 November 1910 – 11 July 1966) was a Latvian basketball player. He competed in the men's tournament at the 1936 Summer Olympics.

References

1910 births
1966 deaths
Latvian men's basketball players
Olympic basketball players of Latvia
Basketball players at the 1936 Summer Olympics
Sportspeople from Liepāja